Ogulsapar Muradova (Turkmen: Огулсапар Мурадова; 1948 — 2006) was a Turkmen human rights activist and Radio Free Europe journalist.

She was the sister of Annadurdy Hajyýew, a leader of the exiled Republican Party of Turkmenistan. She was arrested on June 18, 2006 with two other activists - her brother Sapardurdy Khadzhiev, an associate of the Turkmen Helsinki Foundation for Human Rights, and Annakurban Amanklychev. The state-controlled press  accused them of smearing Turkmenistan's international reputation.

On June 19, President Saparmurat Niyazov personally issued a statement on national television condemning Muradova and other arrested activists. "I don't know why [the detainees] are engaged in such dirty business in Turkmenistan, a peaceful country where justice is ruling and where nobody is disgraced... Let people condemn the traitors. The entire population is proud of their motherland, whereas they are trying to harm it" Niyazov said.

On August 25, 2006 the three activists were sentenced to between six and seven years in jail on charges of illegal possession of weapons.

The trial reportedly lasted less than two hours and defence lawyers were reportedly not given the indictment before the trial commenced.

Muradova died in prison before September 14, 2006 of "natural causes", according to Turkmen officials, but her children are quoted as saying that her body had "marks on the neck" and a "large wound" on the head.

International human rights groups have expressed outrage over her death and called for an independent investigation into the circumstances that led to it.

References

External links
Profile: Ogulsapar Muradova Central Asia Health Review. Oct. 12, 2008

1948 births
2006 deaths
Turkmenistan human rights activists
Assassinated Turkmenistan journalists
Turkmenistan people who died in prison custody
Prisoners who died in Turkmenistan detention
21st-century Turkmenistan writers
20th-century Turkmenistan writers
20th-century journalists
Human rights abuses in Turkmenistan
Censorship in Turkmenistan
People convicted of illegal possession of weapons